The Harpenden Building Society is an English building society, which has its Head Office in Harpenden, Hertfordshire. Formed on 3 March 1953, it is the 30th largest in the United Kingdom based on total assets of £315 million at 31 December 2017. It is a member of the Building Societies Association.

The Societies aim is to grow and provide a flexible and competitive investment and mortgage service whilst returning value to the local community.

It is a traditional and expanding building society and has built its reputation on being able to offer a range of uncomplicated savings accounts as well as "tailor made" mortgage products to suit the individual needs of its borrowers.

The Society was formed on 3 March 1953 by a group of Harpenden residents in order to provide the local community with the ability to borrow money to purchase their own homes. Its first independent office was opened in Station Road in May 1960, with further offices opening in Radlett in May 1981 and Leighton Buzzard in May 1992.

The Society celebrated its golden jubilee in 2003 and it was fitting that in its 50th year a major milestone was reached when the Societies total assets exceeded £100 million.

Since 2003 they have continued to grow each year and the 2013 audited accounts show assets worth over £286 million.

An Agency Office (now closed) was opened in Stopsley in Luton in 2008, in September 2010 a fourth branch opened in Wendover, with a fifth in Tring in January 2011 and sixth in Buckingham in March 2011.

Its branch and agency network is therefore based in the Northern Home Counties, with branches in Radlett, Harpenden, Leighton Buzzard and Tring. Accounts are also operated via post and online banking nationwide.

Supporting its local community in and around all its branch and agency office areas has been a part of the Society's history since its foundation in 1953.

The Society celebrated its 60th anniversary in 2013. In 2015, 2016, and since 2017, each year it has won the What Mortgage Award for Best Local Building Society.

External links
Harpenden Building Society
Building Societies Association

Cultural References
The Harpenden Building Society is mentioned in The Poems of Ewen McTeagle, in Monty Python's Big Red Book (1971)

References

Building societies of England
Banks established in 1953
Organizations established in 1953
Companies based in the City and District of St Albans
1953 establishments in England